Curse of the Queerwolf is a 1988 comedy horror film directed by Mark Pirro. Michael Palazzolo and Kent Butler starred in the film.

Plot
Larry meets someone he believes to be a woman, but is actually a transvestite, who turns him into a "queerwolf" by biting him on the buttocks.  He transforms into a transvestite at night when there is a full moon. People hunting the werewolf discover the transvestite at Larry's apartment, and they also warn him about a curse. A gypsy offers to help him, but Larry refuses until the first full moon that he experiences. The only way for him to combat the transformation is to look at a medallion with a picture of John Wayne.

Cast
 Michael Palazzolo  as Larry Smalbut
 Kent Butler  as Richard Cheese
 Taylor Whitney  as Lois Gerstel
 Cynthia Brownell  as Paula McFarland
 Darwyn Carson  as Holly
 Jim Bruce  as Mr. McFarland
 Sergio Bandera  as Priest
 Mark Pirro  as Torchman
 Rodney Trappe  as Torchman
 John McCafferty  as Mountain Man
 Pat Hunter  as Mountain Man
 Timothy Ralston  as Mountain Man
 Susan Cherones  as Mrs. Thyroid
 Conrad Brooks  as Wally Beaver
 Forrest J Ackerman as Mr. Richardson
 Alfie Pearl  as Detective Morose
 Hugh O. Fields  as Fagxorcist
 Mike Margy  as Custodian
 Cheryl Butler  as Gina
 Natalia Gvozdic  as Dancer
 Don Martin  as TV Newscaster

Production
The film was produced in Santa Barbara with 8mm film, which is the type of film that was used by many very low-budget directors in the late 1980s.

The queerwolf first made an appearance in the director's film A Polish Vampire in Burbank, but it was not in the film for long. Stereotypes of homosexuals are parodied, along with horror conventions.

Reception
Author David Bleiler wrote in his book TLA Video & DVD Guide 2005, "But while offensive to some, it is more harmless camp than incendiary hatred". A Rovi review said, "Tasteless and raunchy, the film will offend many, but those looking for a sick, offbeat comedy will enjoy Pirro's irreverence.

Adam Tyner, writing for DVD Talk, said, "Anyway, even though I do see Curse of the Queerwolf as superior in a number of ways, for whatever reason, I didn't find it particularly funny. That's not to say there aren't funny parts".

Home media
The film had a VHS release in 1994, distributed by Artemis Entertainment. It had a 2003 DVD release with two special features, the documentary Completely From Behind and a commentary. The DVD was distributed by MTI Home Video.

References

External links

1988 horror films
1988 LGBT-related films
1988 films
American comedy horror films
LGBT-related comedy horror films
1980s English-language films
American LGBT-related films
1980s American films